The Bear is the second of the two operas by William Walton, described in publication as an "Extravaganza in One Act".  The libretto was written by Paul Dehn and Walton, based on the play of the same title by Anton Chekhov (which is also sometimes translated into English as The Boor).

Walton received a commission from the Koussevitzsky Foundation in 1958, and he  dedicated the opera "to the memory of Serge and Natalie Koussevitzky". He began composing in 1965 when the Aldeburgh Festival in England requested an opera from him. The Bear was first performed at the Jubilee Hall, Aldeburgh on 3 June 1967.

The opera is regarded as having "enjoyed more success and popularity than its larger-scale predecessor, Troilus and Cressida [......] because its witty parodies are in the manner of [Walton's 1922] Facade" and the librettists' ability "to emulate Chekhov's caricatures of the three main characters" are also successful.

Synopsis
Place: The drawing room of Yelena Ivanovna Popova’s country house
Time: Around 1888
Popova is a widow, remaining faithful to the memory of her late husband, Popov.  Her servant, Luka, remarks upon her affected sorrow.  Smirnov, one of Popov's creditors, appears.  During the course of the story, it becomes clear that Popov was promiscuous and unfaithful to his wife.  Smirnov and Popova begin to quarrel, to the point where both aim loaded pistols at each other.  However, neither can fire, as they have fallen in love.  As the opera ends, Luka looks on in disbelief at the new lovers.

Roles
In contrast with Walton's previous opera Troilus and Cressida, which used a large cast, full orchestra and chorus, The Bear is deliberately minimal in its vocal and instrumental forces. The opera uses 3 singers and a chamber orchestra.

Instrumentation
 Woodwind
 flute (doubling piccolo)
 oboe (doubling English horn)
 clarinet
 bassoon
 Brass
 French horn
 trumpet
 trombone
 Percussion
 timpani, side drum, tenor drum, bass drum, triangle, tambourine, cymbals, suspended cymbal, gong, jingles, 3 wood blocks, whip, rattle, xylophone, vibraphone, tubular bells (in F-sharp and C), crotales, bongos
 Keyboard
 piano
 Strings
 first violin, second violin, viola, cello, double bass (parts may be doubled)
 harp

Recordings
1967: Monica Sinclair, John Shaw, Norman Lumsden; English Chamber Orchestra; James Lockhart, conductor. Audio CD: EMI Classics, Cat: ?? . Original cast recording.
 1982: Daphne Harris, Gregory Yurisich, Noël Mangin; Melbourne Symphony Orchestra; Vanco Cavdarski, conductor (analogue recording) Audio CD: Chandos, Cat: ABR 1052.
1993: Della Jones, Alan Opie, John Shirley-Quirk; Northern Sinfonia; Richard Hickox, conductor. Audio CD: Chandos, Cat: #9245

Editions
2010: A new edition of the opera was prepared by Michael Burden for the Collected Walton Edition

References
Notes

Sources
Holden, Amanda, (ed.), The New Penguin Opera Guide, New York: Penguin Putnam, Inc., 2001 
Kennedy, Michael, "Walton, Sir William", in Stanley Sadie, (ed.), The New Grove Dictionary of Opera, Vol. 4.  London: Macmillan Publishers, Inc. 1998    
Kennedy, Michael, "Bear, The" in Stanley Sadie, (Ed.),  The New Grove Dictionary of Opera, Vol. 1. London: Macmillan Publishers, Inc. 1998

External links
 Oxford University Press "Programme Notes"  Requires login

Operas by William Walton
English-language operas
Operas
One-act operas
1967 operas
Operas based on works by Anton Chekhov
Operas based on plays
Operas set in Russia
Libretti by Paul Dehn